The 1922 Brown Bears football team represented Brown University as an independent during the 1922 college football season. Led by 21st-year head coach Edward N. Robinson, the Bears compiled a record of 6–2–1.

Schedule

References

Brown
Brown Bears football seasons
Brown Bears football